State Road 119 (NM 119) is a  state highway in the U.S. state of New Mexico, entirely within western Guadalupe County. NM 119's western terminus is at NM 386 in Anton Chico, and the eastern terminus is at U.S. Route 84 (US 84) in Dilia. It is a two–lane road for its entire length.

Route description
Beginning in Dilia at the intersection with US 84, mile marker 78, the road heads west past Upper Dilia to the south. At the two mile (3 km) point it passes Llano Del Medio, to the south, at which point the road heads northwest. At milepost 3, there is a road to the south to Llano Veijo which is about a mile away. At about milepost 3.5 the road makes a 90 degree turn to the left, heading southwest, and shortly thereafter is the intersection with NM 451 from the north. After NM 451 the road crosses the Pecos River.

NM 119 enters Anton Chico at the south end of town at a traffic triangle where it terminates at the intersection with NM 386 (mile marker 9) from Tecolotito (San Miguel County). NM 119 formerly turned sharply north at the traffic triangle to pass through Anton Chico and dead end at the Pecos River; a bridge used to cross the Pecos at that point, too.

Major junctions

See also

References

External links

Photographs of NM 119

119
Transportation in Guadalupe County, New Mexico